Tord Wiksten (born June 30, 1971 in Byske) is a former Swedish biathlete. At the 1992 Olympics in Albertville, Wiksten won a bronze medal in the 4 x 7.5 km relay with the Swedish team.  His teammates were Mikael Löfgren, Ulf Johansson, and Leif Andersson.

References

 
 

1971 births
Living people
Swedish male biathletes
Biathletes at the 1992 Winter Olympics
Biathletes at the 1998 Winter Olympics
Biathletes at the 2002 Winter Olympics
Olympic medalists in biathlon
Medalists at the 1992 Winter Olympics
Olympic biathletes of Sweden
Olympic bronze medalists for Sweden
People from Skellefteå Municipality
20th-century Swedish people
21st-century Swedish people